Wog Boys Forever is a 2022 Australian comedy film and the third installment in the Wog Boy trilogy. The film is written by the franchise creator Nick Giannopoulos, and directed by Frank Lotito. The film was preceded by two movies in the franchise, Wog Boy and Wog Boy 2: Kings of Mykonos

Plot 
Steve Karamitsis is a depressed, awkward Greek Australian man who drives Taxis for a living. He lives in Melbourne’s inner north, and in his 50s, is still recovering from a break up with his ex Zoe (Zeta Makrypoulia as portrayed in The Wog Boy 2: Kings of Mykonos). He once again finds himself in challenging circumstances, but is assisted out of these by his friend Frank (played by Vince Colosimo). Steve realises he still has feelings for "the one that got away" girl Cleo (Sarah Roberts), an ex girlfriend, after she randomly hops into his taxi one day. He and decides to woo her, with the help from friends, however is faced with a revenge campaign from the evil Minister for Immigration, Brianna Beagle-Thorpe (Annabel Marshall-Roth), who with her brother Clayton (Liam Seymour) to get revenge on Steve for destroying their late mother Raelene's political career, sometime earlier.

Production 
The film started production in 2019   and started shooting in Melbourne in June, 2021 Giannopoulos initially had challenges getting finance for the film as it was turned down for finance by Screen Australia. He has said the Steve character was influenced by a number of real people  "My films are pretty much based on the communities that I grew up in and people I grew up with. The main character in the Wog Boys films, Steve Karamitsis, is a combination of a great number of people I have met over the years."   Frank Lotito, who directed, had worked with both Giannopolous and Colosimo on some of their stage shows, and he was given the role after Giannopoulos saw his film Growing Up Smith

The film features a Greek ethnic style house in Reservoir, Melbourne, that the production crew had witnessed for sale in a real estate advertisement. It was granted for use by the vendor before the new owners purchased it.

Car 
Steve's car features prominently in the movie. It is a dark blue 1969 VF Valiant hardtop given to him by his father. During the film, it is said that the car's original engine was a 245-cubic-inch (4.0 L) 6-cylinder hemi, which was later replaced with an 8-cylinder engine. The presence of the Valiant in the films has given rise
to the films being called the Blue Valiant Trilogy/The Valiant Trilogy by fans.

Cast 
 Nick Giannopoulos as Steve Karamitsis
 Vince Colosimo as Frank Di Benedetto
 Sarah Roberts as Cleo
 Annabel Marshall-Roth as Brianna Beagle-Thorpe
 Anthony J. Sharpe as Goldi
 Costa D'Angelo as Michael
 Sooshi Mango as Pino, Vince and Guiseppina
 Newnest Addakula as Pardeep
 Havana Brown as Sapphire
 Derryn Hinch as himself
 Jason Agius as George
 Claudia Hruschka as Sophie

See also
 Cinema of Australia
 Cinema of Greece

External links

References 

Australian comedy films
2022 films
2022 comedy films
2020s Australian films